Fremont, Wisconsin may refer to in the U.S. state of Wisconsin:
Fremont, Wisconsin, a village 
Fremont, Clark County, Wisconsin, a town
Fremont, Waupaca County, Wisconsin, a town